Soutice is a municipality and village in Benešov District in the Central Bohemian Region of the Czech Republic. It has about 200 inhabitants.

Administrative parts
Villages of Černýš and Kalná are administrative parts of Soutice.

References

Villages in Benešov District